Tom Havelock is a British singer-songwriter and lead singer of the band PREP. He is also sometimes known by his stage name Tom Cane.

Music career

Early beginnings
Havelock was an academic and music scholar at Eton before becoming a student at the University of Oxford when he decide to join in a band with his three close childhood friends back in 1997 to play a few college gigs. Along with Henry Morton Jack, Marcus Efstratiou and Rupert Harrison, they initially performed under the name The Full Monty. Their sound was comparable to the likes of Crosby, Stills, Nash & Young – breezy West Coast harmonies and lightweight sunshine psychedelia. An early demo caught the imagination of local label Shifty Disco (themselves still in their first year infancy). In the November of that year a single "Welcome" was released. This was followed by a national tour with labelmates Beaker and Dustball. The band started to gel into a serious unit, but things were moving on already. They parted company with Rupert and recruited a new member, Owen O'Rorke. Their name changed to Hester Thrale and they started to move away from their early sounds, using more keyboards and more experimental guitar sounds, inspired by the likes of Radiohead, Pink Floyd and The Beatles (circa The White Album-period). All four members are accomplished musicians and switch between guitar, keyboard and bass. Tom was the group's primary vocalist.

The band's music have often been compared to that of Radiohead, Pink Floyd, The Doors, Human League and German experimental work. The band had actually supported Radiohead at their gig in South Park, Oxford. They were selected personally by Radiohead from 120 local acts to open the all-day concert. Shortly afterwards they signed to the fledgling db Records in 2001, a label set up by veteran A&R man David Bates, the man who discovered Def Leppard. They had met Dave three years prior after he went to their first ever gig at The Pit in Witney. At the time the only other notable acts of the label were the Brighton duo known as The Electric Soft Parade and singer-songwriter Tom McRae. The band have been ensconced in the studio, writing and recording at a prolific rate, something that had become their trademark over the previous couple of years.

They have also undergone two more name changes: initially they had been known as Moth for a few months, but after being contacted by a Christian rock outfit from Cardiff, whom had explained their strong rights to the name, they had finally settled on the name Psychid. They put out a series of singles and EPs receiving BBC Radio One plays from Mark Radcliffe and Jo Whiley before the release of their critically acclaimed debut album in 2003. The album was recorded with producer Chris Hughes, a man who previously went under the name of Merrick in Adam & The Ants. Following support slots with Radiohead, The Electric Soft Parade, and Brendan Benson, the band parted ways in 2006.

Eventually, Tom founded Hook and the Twin with drummer Marcus Efstratiou. The duo have released a string of singles, attracting radio DJ fans, including Rob da Bank, Huw Stephens, John Kennedy and Zane Lowe. Their first album titled Never Ever Ever was released in 2013.

Havelock was also an accomplished cellist. He has performed in tracks for Tom McRae's 2000 self-titled album and the Cold Specks' 2012 album I Predict a Graceful Expulsion.

As a writer
Tom has been working with various artists and producers including Raleigh Ritchie, Joel Compass, Sinead Harnett and Craze & Hoax. He adopted the stage name Tom Cane in 2011 and began his solo career as a songwriter. He co-wrote the first single from Sub Focus' new album, "Falling Down" featuring Kenzie May in late 2011. He co-wrote and featured on the single "Through the Night" for Drumsound and Bassline Smith in mid-2012. He has also worked with Cheryl Cole as well, co-writing the title track for her third studio album A Million Lights.

He had co-written the hit single "Magnetic Eyes" featuring Baby Blue with Matrix and Futurebound, which was A List at Radio 1 for 6 weeks. A year later, Tom continued his successful partnership with Matrix and Futurebound, writing their biggest track to date, "Control" featuring Max Marshall, which spent three weeks in the top 10 and has been a major UK airplay hit. Recently, he was a featured performer in the UK top 40 hit single "Half Light" by British musician Wilkinson, which reached number 25 in the UK Singles Chart. It was originally released as the final track from his 2013 album Lazers Not Included before being its sixth and final single.

In 2014, Cane was featured as an uncredited vocalist in songs for Swedish DJ and producer Eric Prydz and Austrian dance music duo Klangkarussell.

PREP
Havelock joined the band PREP in 2014 as the lead singer, completing the lineup along with bandmates: Llywelyn Ap Myrddin, Guillaume Jambel (GIOM) and Daniel Radclyffe.

Discography

Singles

As featured artist

Other appearances

Singles

Non-singles

References

External links
 
 Tom Havelock credits on AllMusic
 
 Triptik Management – Tom Havelock

English electronic musicians
English male singers
English songwriters
Musicians from Oxfordshire
Living people
Date of birth missing (living people)
Year of birth missing (living people)
British male songwriters